Steven Kretiuk (born 4 July 1972) is a former Australian rules footballer who played with the Western Bulldogs in the Australian Football League (AFL).

Kretiuk was a defender and spent over a decade at Footscray, with injuries preventing him from playing many more games than the 170 he finished with. He finished second in the club's 1994 best and fairest awards.

Kretiuk coached the Western Jets in the TAC Cup between 2008 and 2012.

Kretiuk currently coaches the Hoppers Crossing Football Club Senior side

References

External links

1972 births
Living people
Australian rules footballers from Victoria (Australia)
Western Bulldogs players